Events in the year 2017 in Belize.

Incumbents
 Monarch: Elizabeth II
 Prime Minister: Dean Barrow

Events
San Pedro Pirates FC, a football team based in San Pedro, is established. The team competed in the 2017–18 Premier League of Belize.

Deaths
16 February – Osmond P. Martin, Roman Catholic Bishop (b. 1930).

19 February – Leela Vernon, cultural person noted for her contributions to preserving Creole culture (b. 1950).

References

 
Years of the 21st century in Belize
Belize
Belize
2010s in Belize